Bagby is an unincorporated community in Mariposa County, California. Lake McClure covers the original town site.

A post office operated at Bagby from 1897 to 1951. The name honors Benjamin A. Bagby, owner of the local hotel, store, and saloon.

References

Unincorporated communities in California
Unincorporated communities in Mariposa County, California